Harefuah (Hebrew: הרפואה) is a medical journal published by the Israel Medical Association. Articles are in Hebrew with abstracts in English. It has been published monthly since 1920. Its editor is Yehuda Shoenfeld.

External links 
 
 Journal page at the site of the Israel Medical Association

Hebrew-language journals
Publications established in 1920
General medical journals
Monthly journals

it:Harefuah